Johan Bruyneel (born 23 August 1964) is a Belgian former professional road bicycle racer and a former directeur sportif for UCI ProTour team , and  (later known as Discovery Channel), a US-based UCI ProTour cycling team. On 25 October 2018, the World Anti Doping Agency imposed a lifetime ban on Bruyneel for his role in a doping scandal that also saw Lance Armstrong stripped of his seven Tour de France titles.

History

Professional cyclist 
Born in Izegem, Belgium, Bruyneel was a successful professional cyclist.  Early wins included the 1990 Tour de l'Avenir, the 1991 Rund um den Henninger Turm, the 1992 Grand Prix des Nations and Coppa Placci, and stage 6 (Évreux > Amiens) and finishing 7th at the 1993 Tour de France. His stage win set the record for fastest stage at 49.417 km/h, since then only broken by two cyclists.

His greatest successes as a pro cyclist came in 1995.  At the 1995 Tour de France, he won stage 7, which began in Charleroi and ended in Liège, Belgium, and took the yellow jersey in his home country.  Bruyneel launched an escape and was joined by eventual winner Miguel Indurain.  The Spaniard took the lead and rode the stage as a time-trial to gain time on his main rivals, with Bruyneel latched onto his wheel, barely able to follow the tempo.  He then beat Indurain in the end sprint to win the stage.  Bruyneel admitted he felt somewhat uneasy about how he had won.  However, the win into Liège afforded him a chance meeting with the King of Belgium during the prize presentations.  That same year, Bruyneel achieved his only podium finish in a Grand Tour when he finished 3rd at the 1995 Vuelta a España and won the Aalst criterium.

In the 1996 Tour de France, he missed a curve when descending a hill in stage 7 (Chambéry > Les Arcs), and disappeared into a ravine. The moment was captured by a camera team that was driving right behind the group of descenders. After some time, Bruyneel could be seen climbing out of the ravine and getting back onto his bike to continue the stage, apparently unscathed.

Team director 

Following his retirement from cycling in 1998 at age 34, Bruyneel accepted the position of managing director of the U.S. Postal Service cycling team, whose star, Lance Armstrong, had finished fourth in the 1998 Vuelta a España, but whose team, in Armstrong's words, was the Bad News Bears, a mismatch of bikes, cars, clothing, equipment," with a total budget of only $3 million. Bruyneel's team promptly won eight of the next nine editions of the Tour de France, with Armstrong winning seven straight prior to his retirement in 2005 and then Alberto Contador winning in 2007 with Levi Leipheimer finishing third. However, Discovery Channel, which had taken over as the sponsor of the team in 2005, decided to withdraw in 2007 in the wake of the sport's extensive doping scandals, and the team disbanded. At that point, Bruyneel's teams had won ten Grand Tour championships in nine years (8 Tours de France, 1 Giro d'Italia (Savoldelli, 2005) and 1 Vuelta a España (Heras, 2003). Seven of these victories have since been nullified with the disqualification of Lance Armstrong from 1999 to 2005 from the Tour de France by USADA with ratification from the UCI

At the time, Bruyneel announced his retirement and his plans to write a book. Bruyneel's book, We Might As Well Win, was published by Houghton Mifflin on 4 June 2008. Also, on 29 May 2008, Bruyneel joined the Board of Directors of World Bicycle Relief. But his retirement did not materialize.

In October 2007, after negotiations with the Kazakh government, Bruyneel was signed to take over control of the embattled  team, which had been kicked out of the 2007 Tour de France for doping violations and was in shambles over its doping connections. He brought Discovery's Contador and Leipheimer with him for the 2008 season.  Although the team was banned from the Tour de France for its past doping history, Contador won both the 2008 Giro d'Italia and the 2008 Vuelta a España, making Contador the youngest rider to win all three Grand Tour championships.  Additionally, Leipheimer finished second at the Vuelta.

Contador's victory in the Tour de France meant that Bruyneel had won four of the last six Grand Tours that his teams entered, and thirteen Grand Tour championships in eleven years (seven of these victories have since been nullified with the disqualification of Lance Armstrong from 1999 to 2005 from the Tour de France by USADA with ratification from the UCI). In 2010, Team RadioShack was formed with sponsorship from Radio Shack and Trek Bicycle Corporation. Bruyneel confirmed his departure from Astana at the end of the 2009 season to join Team RadioShack.

Conviction for doping 

As of May 2010, he was under investigation by the Belgian cycling federation, after being accused by Floyd Landis of involvement in systematic doping while director sportif of Lance Armstrong's US Postal team.

On 28 June 2012, Bruyneel was accused by USADA (United States Anti-Doping Agency), although he is not an American citizen. Allegations include the assumption that Bruyneel was part of a long-running doping conspiracy, including the use of banned methods to augment the performance of the cycling teams that he directed. As a result of the allegations, Bruyneel declined to appear at the 2012 Tour de France, where he had been expected to direct the RadioShack-Nissan team.

While some accused in this case, such as Lance Armstrong and Michele Ferrari, did not seek to formally contest the charges via arbitration, Bruyneel asked for an arbitration hearing.

The termination was by mutual agreement with owners of Leopard SA. The day after Armstrong's acknowledgment that he doped during all of his Tours, Bruyneel announced that he would be in Brussels as soon as possible to speak to the Belgian national cycling organization and cooperate with its investigation.

In November 2013, Armstrong settled a lawsuit with Acceptance Insurance Company (AIC).  AIC had sought to recover $3 million it had paid Armstrong as bonuses for winning the Tour de France from 1999 to 2001.  The suit was settled for an undisclosed sum the day before Armstrong was scheduled to give an oral deposition under oath.  In a written deposition for the lawsuit, Armstrong stated under oath that, "Johan Bruyneel participated in or assisted with Armstrong's use of PEDs, and knew of that use through their conversations and acts."

In April 2014, Bruyneel was given a ten-year ban by USADA, who noted that "the evidence establishes conclusively that Mr. Bruyneel was at the apex of a conspiracy to commit widespread doping on the USPS and Discovery Channel teams spanning many years and many riders." Said Bruyneel about the ban, "I do not dispute that there are certain elements of my career that I wish had been different.  However, a very small minority of us has been used as scapegoats for an entire generation."

In October 2018, the World Anti-Doping Agency successfully increased his ten-year ban to a lifetime ban.

Palmarès

As rider

1989
 2nd and 9th stages of the Tour of Switzerland
 3rd place, Tour de Vendée
1990
 1st, Tour de l'Avenir
1991
 1st, Rund um den Henninger Turm
 2nd place, Tour of the Basque Country
1992
 1st, Coppa Placci
 1st, Grand Prix des Nations
 12th stage of Vuelta a España
1993
 6th stage of Tour de France
1994
 3rd stage of Vuelta a La Rioja
1995
 5th stage of Grand Prix du Midi Libre
 7th stage of Tour de France
1996
 3rd stage of Hofbrau Cup
1997
 1st, La Flèche Namuroise

Grand Tour general classification results timeline

Did not finish = DNF; In progress = IP; Voided results = struck through.

As director
 Giro d'Italia (2): Winner of the general classification with Paolo Savoldelli in 2005, and with Alberto Contador in 2008.
 Tours de France (2): Winner of the general classification with Alberto Contador in 2007 and 2009. 
Lance Armstrong was disqualified from seven Tour de France victories directed by Bruyneel.
 Vuelta a España (2): Winner of the general classification with Roberto Heras in 2003 and with Alberto Contador in 2008.

Written work 
 We Might As Well Win: On the Road to Success with the Mastermind Behind a Record-Setting Eight Tour de France Victories,

See also
Johan Bruyneel Cycling Academy

References

External links 
 
 Official Tour de France results for Johan Bruyneel
 

1964 births
Doping cases in cycling
Belgian sportspeople in doping cases
Living people
People from Izegem
Belgian male cyclists
Belgian Tour de France stage winners
Cyclists at the 1996 Summer Olympics
Olympic cyclists of Belgium
Belgian Vuelta a España stage winners
Directeur sportifs
Tour de Suisse stage winners
Cyclists from West Flanders
Sportspeople banned for life